The Dewar–Chatt–Duncanson model is a model in organometallic chemistry that explains the chemical bonding in transition metal alkene complexes. The model is named after Michael J. S. Dewar, Joseph Chatt and L. A. Duncanson.

The alkene donates electron density into a π-acid metal d-orbital from a π-symmetry bonding orbital between the carbon atoms. The metal donates electrons back from a (different) filled d-orbital into the empty π* antibonding orbital. Both of these effects tend to reduce the carbon-carbon bond order, leading to an elongated C−C distance and a lowering of its vibrational frequency.

In Zeise's salt K[PtCl3(C2H4)].H2O the C−C bond length has increased to 134 picometres from 133 pm for ethylene. In the nickel compound Ni(C2H4)(PPh3)2 the value is 143 pm.

The interaction also causes carbon atoms to "rehybridise" from sp2 towards sp3, which is indicated by the bending of the hydrogen atoms on the ethylene back away from the metal. In silico calculations show that 75% of the binding energy is derived from the forward donation and 25% from backdonation. This model is a specific manifestation of the more general π backbonding model.

References

Organometallic chemistry
Chemical bonding